Thomas Geoffrey Reeves Clark (born 27 February 2001) is an English cricketer. He made his first-class debut on 23 September 2019, for Sussex in the 2019 County Championship. Prior to his first-class debut, Clark has played for the England under-19 cricket team. In October 2019, he was named in the England under-19 cricket team's squad for a 50-over tri-series in the Caribbean. In December 2019, he was named in England's squad for the 2020 Under-19 Cricket World Cup. He made his List A debut on 23 July 2021, for Sussex in the 2021 Royal London One-Day Cup.

In April 2022, in the opening round of matches in the 2022 County Championship, Clark scored his maiden century in first-class cricket, with 100 runs against Nottinghamshire.

References

External links
 

2001 births
Living people
English cricketers
Sussex cricketers
Place of birth missing (living people)
People from Haywards Heath
English cricketers of the 21st century